Oslo Fergene is a passenger ferry operator in Oslo, Norway.
 The company has contracts with Ruter to operate ferries from Oslo City Hall to the islands of Hovedøya, Bleikøya, Gressholmen, Lindøya, Nakholmen and Langøyene on routes 91–94.

Shipping companies of Norway
Companies based in Oslo
Ferry companies of Oslo
Companies with year of establishment missing